Winston Reid (born 29 September 1962 in Barbados) is a former West Indian cricketer. He was a left-handed batsman and a left-arm spin bowler. In total, he played 100 first-class and List A matches for his native Barbados, including the cricket tournament at the 1998 Commonwealth Games.

References

External links
Cricket Archive profile

1962 births
Living people
Barbados cricketers
Cricketers at the 1998 Commonwealth Games
Commonwealth Games competitors for Barbados
Barbadian cricketers